Mike Birch (1 November 1931 – 26 October 2022) was a Canadian navigator.

Biography
Birch began sailing later in his life, but gained notoriety in the 1976 OSTAR where he came in second on a 30' trimaran "The Third Turtle" beating the 236' "CLUB MEDITERRANEE".  He continued his surprising success as a solo sailor in the inaugural Route du Rhum in 1978. His sailboat, the Olympus Photo, a 12 meter trimaran, caught up with the larger  of  late in the race.

Birch's victory at the Route du Rhum would be his only one on a monohull and begin the reign of the multihull, particularly following the death of Alain Colas. Birch continued a long career racing offshore, completing his final race at the Transat Jacques Vabre in 2007, where he finished in 16th place.

Birch died in Brech, France on 26 October 2022, at the age of 90.

References

1931 births
2022 deaths
Navigators
People from Vancouver